The 22833 / 22834 Bhubaneswar – SMVT Bengaluru Humsafar Express is a Humsafar Express train of the Indian Railways connecting Bhubaneswar in Odisha and SMVT Bengaluru in Karnataka. It is currently being operated with 22833/22834 train numbers on a weekly basis.

Coach Composition 

The trains is completely 3-tier AC sleeper trains designed by Indian Railways with features of LED screen display to show information about stations, train speed etc. and will have announcement system as well, Vending machines for tea, coffee and milk, Bio toilets in compartments as well as CCTV cameras.

The train consists of 19 coaches :

 16 AC III Tier
 1 Pantry Car
 2 Power Generator Car

Service

It averages 60 km/hr as 22833 Humsafar Express starts on Monday and covering 1512 km in 25 hrs & 59 km/hr as 22834 Humsafar Express starts on Tuesday covering 1512 km in 25h 40m.

Traction
It is hauled by a  based WAP 7 locomotive from BBS to VSKP and VSKP to SMVT it is hauled by a  based WAP 7 locomotive.

Schedule

RSA - Rake Sharing

08408/08407 - 08408 Secunderabad–Bhubaneswar Summer AC Special

Stoppage

Direction Reversal

Train Reverses its direction 1 times:

See also 

 Humsafar Express
 Bhubaneswar railway station
 Krishnarajapuram railway station
 Howrah–Yesvantpur Humsafar Express
 Bangalore Cantonment–Kamakhya Humsafar Express

Notes

References

References 
22833/Bhubaneswar - Krishnarajapuram HumSafar Express
22834/Krishnarajapuram - Bhubaneswar HumSafar Express

Transport in Bhubaneswar
Transport in Bangalore
Humsafar Express trains
Rail transport in Odisha
Rail transport in Andhra Pradesh
Rail transport in Tamil Nadu
Rail transport in Karnataka
Railway services introduced in 2017